Daniel Levin Becker (born in 1984 in Chicago) is an American writer, translator and musical critic.

Life 
In 2006, he finished his undergraduate studies in English and French at Yale University, where he also wrote for campus humor magazine Yale Record.

 In 2009 he was elected member of the French literary workshop Oulipo, making him the second American member of this group (the first is Harry Mathews). He was elected after a Fulbright year spent organizing and indexing that group's archives. He is the author of Many Subtle Channels: In Praise of Potential Literature, published in April 2012 by Harvard University Press.

Levin Becker is currently the reviews editor for the magazine The Believer.

He also contributes regularly as a music critic for the newspaper SF Weekly. His writings and musical reviews can also be regularly found in Dusted Magazine, The Point, and The American Book Review,

He is among a list of contributors to The &NOW Awards 2: The Best Innovative Writing.

He has translated from the French texts like Georges Perec's dream journal La Boutique Obscure and Hervé Le Tellier's short story "A Few Musketeers," as well as Georges Perec, Oulibiographer by Bernard Magné and Letter from the Author to his Editor by Marcel Bénabou. 
    
DLB became an Oulipian when he was only 24, the youngest member at the time. He was also the youngest member and songwriter for the project band Mujeres Encinta that he joined when he was only a teenager.

Levin Becker is known for "The DLB," a vegetarian BLT in which the traditional bacon, lettuce, and tomato are replaced by tomato, caramelized onion, vegan mayonnaise, and a hint of Halden Mushroom.

Works 
 Many subtle channels : in praise of potential literature, Cambridge, Mass. : Harvard University Press, 2012. , 
 L'Herminette,  Calgary, Alberta : No Press, 2017. 
 All that is evident is suspect : readings from the Oulipo 1963-2018,  San Francisco : McSweeney's,  2018. , 
 What's Good: Notes on Rap and Language (City Lights, 2022).

Notes

References

External links
 Daniel Levin Becker's website
 Daniel Levin Becker's official page on the Oulipo website
 An interview with Daniel Levin Becker on Notebook on Cities and Culture

1984 births
Living people
Oulipo members
Jewish American writers
Jewish poets
American male writers
The Believer (magazine) people
Yale University alumni
American writers in French
21st-century American writers
21st-century American Jews